Rosemary T. Lesser is an American politician and physician from Utah. Since January 2021, she has served as a member of the Utah House of Representatives from the 10th district.

Career 
Lesser is a member of the Public Education Appropriations Subcommittee, Retirement and Independent Entities Appropriations Subcommittee, House Health and Human Services Committee, and House Political Subdivisions Committee. She announced that she will sponsor legislation to remove the sales tax on food in the 2022 legislative session.

References

External links
 Official campaign site

Year of birth missing (living people)
Living people
Democratic Party members of the Utah House of Representatives
University of Notre Dame alumni